
Gmina Jabłonna is a semi-rural gmina (administrative district) in Legionowo County, Masovian Voivodeship, in east-central Poland.

Villages
Gmina Jabłonna contains the villages and settlements of Boża Wola, Chotomów, Dąbrowa Chotomowska, Jabłonna, Janówek Drugi, Rajszew, Skierdy, Suchocin, Trzciany and Wólka Górska.

Neighbouring gminas
Gmina Jabłonna is bordered by Warsaw, by the towns of Legionowo and Nowy Dwór Mazowiecki, and by the gminas of Czosnów, Łomianki, Nieporęt and Wieliszew.

References

Polish official population figures 2006

Jablonna
Legionowo County